Pretty Polly (March 1901 – 17 August 1931) was an Irish-bred, British-trained Thoroughbred racehorse and broodmare. One of the greatest fillies ever to race in Britain, she won fifteen consecutive races and was only the fifth horse to win the British Fillies Triple Crown since its inception in 1814. Pretty Polly also became one of the greatest broodmares of the century.

Breeding
Her sire was the good stallion, Gallinule who was also a roarer and bleeder. Pretty Polly’s dam was the cluster mare, Admiration by Saraband, who won two small races in Ireland, before being tried as a steeplechaser. Admiration foaled nine winners, which won 42 races worth £52,484, and founded a successful female family, which included top class gallopers Craganour, Cresta Run, King John and Tehran.

Racing record
Pretty Polly was bred and owned by Major Eustace Loder and trained by Peter Gilpin, she won nine races from nine starts as a two-year-old in 1903.

The following year, Pretty Polly won the 1,000 Guineas as 1-4 favourite, winning easily by three lengths in record time. Other wins as a three-year-old were The Oaks, the Coronation Stakes at Royal Ascot, the Nassau Stakes at Goodwood, the St. Leger Stakes (completing the Fillies' Triple Crown) and the Park Hill Stakes with jockey William Lane.

Pretty Polly stayed in training as a four and five-year-old, winning six more races, including the Coronation Cup in 1905 and 1906.

In total, Pretty Polly won 22 of her 24 races, placing second twice, in Paris in 1904 and in the 1906 Ascot Gold Cup.

Stud record
Pretty Polly was returned to the place of her birth, Eyrefield Lodge Stud, to begin her new career as a broodmare. Here Pretty Polly produced ten foals and four of these were flat race winners who between them won eleven races for £6,107.  Another son, Tudor King (1920) won a small hurdle race. Her four daughters (each by a different sire) were successful as broodmares, founding the classic winning Pretty Polly family which remains important in the stud book. Pretty Polly was the fourth dam of the good sire, Donatello II, the fifth dam of Brigadier Gerard and the sixth dam of The Derby winner St. Paddy.

Honours
Pretty Polly was recorded as Cluster mare, number CM/73 by Denis Craig in his book, Breeding Racehorses from Cluster Mares. In A Century of Champions by John Randall and Tony Morris she was named Broodmare of the Century as the Matriarch of Family 14-C, the most successful female family in Thoroughbred racing history.

The London and North Eastern Railway named one of its class A3 Pacific express steam locomotives (no. 2560, later 60061; in service from 1925 to 1963) Pretty Polly after the racehorse.

Pedigree

See also
 List of historical horses
 List of leading Thoroughbred racehorses
 Triple Crown of Thoroughbred Racing

References

External links
 Thoroughbred Heritage: Pretty Polly
 Pretty Polly article

1901 racehorse births
1931 racehorse deaths
Racehorses bred in Ireland
Racehorses trained in the United Kingdom
Thoroughbred family 14-b
Thoroughbred family 14-c
St Leger winners
1000 Guineas winners
Epsom Oaks winners